Terms of service are the legal agreements between a service provider and a person who wants to use that service.

Terms of service may also refer to:

 Terms of Service; Didn't Read
 "Terms of Service" (Legends of Tomorrow)